Nessuno è perfetto (Nobody's Perfect) is a 1981 Italian comedy film directed by Pasquale Festa Campanile. The film was a great commercial success, grossing over 10 billion lire at the Italian box office. For her performance Ornella Muti won the Globo d'oro for best actress.

Plot 
Guerrino, a prematurely widowed businessman, falls in love with Chantal. Later he discovers that she was a former paratrooper in the German army who changed sex a few years earlier.

Cast 
 Renato Pozzetto as Guerrino Castiglione
 Ornella Muti as Chantal
 Lina Volonghi as mother-in-law of Guerrino 
 Felice Andreasi as Enzo
 Massimo Boldi as taxi driver "Lingua profonda"
 Gabriele Tinti as Nanni

See also    
 List of Italian films of 1983

References

External links

1981 films
1981 LGBT-related films
Italian comedy films
1981 comedy films
Films directed by Pasquale Festa Campanile
Italian LGBT-related films
Films scored by Riz Ortolani
1980s Italian-language films
1980s Italian films